Central Visayas (or Gitnang Visayas) is an administrative region in the Philippines, numerically designated as Region VII. It consists of four provinces: (Cebu, Bohol, Negros Oriental, and Siquijor) and three highly urbanized cities: Cebu City, Lapu-Lapu, and Mandaue).

Major islands are the eponymous Cebu, Bohol, and Siquijor, together with the eastern part of Negros. The regional center and largest city is Cebu City. The region is dominated by the native speakers of four Visayan languages: Cebuano, Bantayanon, Boholano, and Porohanon.

On May 29, 2015, the region was redefined, when Central Visayas (Region VII) lost the province of Negros Oriental to the newly formed Negros Island Region. However, the region was dissolved, with Negros Oriental returned to Central Visayas on August 9, 2017.

Etymology
The name of the region was mostly chosen by American colonists to denote the centrality of the islands within the bigger Visayas area. There have been proposals to rename the current Central Visayas region, which is dominated by the Cebuano (Sugbuanon) ethnic group, to Sugbu region, the former name of the region prior to Spanish colonization in the 16th century. The name refers to the former kingdom of the region, the Rajahnate of Cebu, or Sugbu in Cebuano.

History
Regions first came into existence on September 24, 1972, when the provinces of the Philippines were organized into 11 regions by Presidential Decree No. 1 as part of the Integrated Reorganization Plan by President Ferdinand Marcos. The provinces of Cebu, Bohol, and Negros Oriental (including its then-subprovince of Siquijor) were grouped together to form the Central Visayas region.

By virtue of Executive Order No. 183 issued on May 29, 2015, by President Benigno Aquino III, the province of Negros Oriental was removed from Central Visayas to form the Negros Island Region along with Negros Occidental and its provincial capital, Bacolod. But later Negros Oriental and its capital, Dumaguete back into Central Visayas on August 9, 2017, when President Rodrigo Duterte dissolved the Negros Island Region, revoking Executive Order No. 183, s. 2015 by signing Executive Order No. 38, citing lack of funds to fully establish the NIR, according to Benjamin Diokno, then Secretary of Budget and Management.

Geography

Central Visayas consists of the two major island provinces of Cebu and Bohol, as well as the smaller island of Siquijor and several outlying islands. It also includes the eastern half of the larger island of Negros. The straits of Cebu and Tañon are also part of the region as well. The region is bordered to the north by the Visayan Sea, west by the province of Negros Occidental in Western Visayas, south by the Bohol Sea, and east by the Camotes Sea and the island of Leyte in Eastern Visayas.

Administrative divisions

Provinces
The Central Visayas region consists of four provinces and three independent cities:

Governors and vice governors

Cities

Demographics

According to the 2020 census, it had a population of 8,081,988. The 2015 census showed an average annual population growth rate of 1.76% from 2010 to 2015, slightly higher than the national average of 1.72%.

Languages
The native languages of Central Visayas are:
 Bantayanon, spoken in Bantayan Island of Cebu province.
 Boholano, a Cebuano dialect spoken in Bohol.
 Cebuano, spoken in Cebu, Negros Oriental, Bohol, and Siquijor. It is the regional lingua franca.
 Hiligaynon, spoken in western Negros Oriental.
 Porohanon, spoken in Camotes Islands of Cebu province.

Economy

Transportation

Ports

The Port of Cebu is the region's main gateway. There are also ports in Tagbilaran in Bohol, Larena in Siquijor, and Sibulan and Dumaguete, both in Negros Oriental. Inter-island shipping is served by numerous shipping lines, two of them fastcraft companies which serve all the provinces in the region.

Airports

Mactan–Cebu International Airport, located in Lapu-Lapu City, is the country's second busiest airport (after Ninoy Aquino International Airport in Metro Manila) and one of the only four airports in the Visayas serving international flights (aside from Bohol–Panglao International Airport, Kalibo International Airport and Iloilo International Airport). It is the secondary hub of Cebu Pacific and Philippine Airlines (and both of the airlines' subsidiaries), with flights to locations throughout the country. It also serves international flights to other Asian and intercontinental destinations.

The other airport in the region is Sibulan Airport, a domestic airport which serves Dumaguete and the rest of Negros Oriental.

Mass media 
Cebu City is the main media hub for both the region. Large media networks – ABS-CBN, GMA Network, TV5, People's Television Network, CNN Philippines, and IBC 13 – maintain their respective local stations and branches for viewership, commercial and news coverage purposes. Most of these stations broadcast local news and public affairs as well as entertainment and dramas to cater the local viewers.

Aside from the 24 national daily newspapers available, Cebu City also has 20 local newspapers. Among the widely read are Sun.Star Cebu, Cebu Daily News, and The Freeman. The country's main Islamic news journal, The Voice of Islam, was founded in 1961 and published in this city.

References

External links 
 
 
 

 
Regions of the Philippines
Visayas